Kristen Welker (born July 1, 1976) is an American television journalist working for NBC News. She serves as a White House correspondent based in Washington, D.C., and co-anchor of Weekend Today, the Saturday edition of Today, alongside Peter Alexander.

Early life and education
Welker is the daughter of Harvey and Julie Welker.  Her father is an engineer, her mother a real estate agent. Welker's father is white and her mother is black. She graduated from Germantown Friends School in Philadelphia in 1994 and Harvard College with a Bachelor of Arts in 1998. At Harvard, she majored in history and graduated with honors. Welker also interned for Today in 1997, while at Harvard.

Career
Welker has worked at ABC affiliates WLNE-TV in Providence, Rhode Island, and KRCR-TV in Redding/Chico, California, and joined NBC in 2005 at affiliate WCAU in Philadelphia, where she was a reporter and weekend anchor. She then joined NBC News in 2010 as a correspondent based at the NBC News West Coast Headquarters in Burbank, California. She became an NBC White House correspondent in December 2011.

Welker regularly represents MSNBC at the daily White House press briefings as well as reports live for various programs on the channel. She occasionally fills in on NBC Nightly News and Today. On January 10, 2020, NBC announced that Welker would become the regular co-anchor of Weekend Today alongside Peter Alexander. She debuted as co-anchor on Weekend Today on January 11, 2020.

Personal life
Welker married John Hughes on March 4, 2017, in Philadelphia. Their daughter was born in June 2021 through a surrogate.

References

External links
 NBC's Bio of Kristen Welker

1976 births
Living people
African-American television personalities
African-American women journalists
American television reporters and correspondents
American women television journalists
Germantown Friends School alumni
Harvard College alumni
MSNBC people
NBC News people